Sonipat Junction railway station is located in Sonipat district in the Indian state of Haryana.
Sonipat junction railway station is a major junction in Delhi NCR.

It is also connected to Gohana, via the Gohana–Sonepat rail line.

And it is also connected to Jind, via the Sonepat–Jind rail lines.

There is also a proposal connecting Palwal directly from Sonepat. Haryana government has given approval to connect Harsana Kala to Palwal railway station. This will directly connect North Haryana to  Southern Haryana. To reduce Delhi mein rail traffic, it will be a bypass pariyojna which will run along the KMP Expressway.

References

Railway stations in Haryana
Sonipat district
Transport in Sonipat
Haryana